Engine Company No. 6 is located in Hoboken, Hudson County, New Jersey, United States. The firehouse was built in 1907 and was added to the National Register of Historic Places on March 30, 1984. A renovation occurred in 2008 at a cost of $650,000. The renovation included a new sprinkler system, a steel-reinforced floor, a kitchen and a physical training room. The firehouse currently houses Engine Company 3 and Rescue Company 1 of the Hoboken Fire Department.

See also
National Register of Historic Places listings in Hudson County, New Jersey

References

Buildings and structures in Hoboken, New Jersey
Fire stations completed in 1907
Fire stations on the National Register of Historic Places in New Jersey
National Register of Historic Places in Hudson County, New Jersey
New Jersey Register of Historic Places